The fifteenth season of Food Paradise, an American food reality television series narrated by Jess Blaze Snider on the Travel Channel, premiered on January 21, 2018. First-run episodes of the series aired in the United States on the Travel Channel on Mondays at 10:00 p.m. EDT. The season contained 13 episodes and concluded airing on April 22, 2018.

Food Paradise features the best places to find various cuisines at food locations across America. Each episode focuses on a certain type of restaurant, such as "Diners", "Bars", "Drive-Thrus" or "Breakfast" places that people go to find a certain food specialty.

Episodes

The Last Food Frontier

Brew and Chew

Chowin' Down the Mississippi River

Feast From The East

Street Eats

T.G.I. Fried

Cheat Day

Bodacious Bowls

Eat at Joe's

The Bucket List

Destination Delicious

Paradise University

Eat, Drink, Play

References

External links
Food Paradise @Travelchannel.com

2018 American television seasons